Seher Devrim Yakut (born 27 May 1968) is a Turkish actress.

Life and career 
Yakut graduated from Ankara University DTCF Theatre Department in 1992. She first studied theatre theories and then acting in the DTCF Theatre Department. She joined the Adana State Theatre as an actress in 1994 and worked there until 2003. She subsequently founded the Adana Theatre Workshop. In addition to acting, she also worked as a producer and instructor in this institution. She was appointed to Ankara State Theatre in 2003. In 2005, she started teaching basic acting at Ankara University DTCF Theatre Department. She worked as the deputy director of the Ankara State Theatre in 2007, and the director of the Ankara State Theatre in 2007–2008. Between 2006 and 2007, she joined the Aysa Production Theatre as a guest actress with the play Kocasını Pişiren Kadın. She subsequently taught acting in the master's program at Bahçeşehir University and later at Das Das Academy. Since late 2000s, she has appeared in various films and TV productions.

In addition to acting, In 2021, her first book Aklımın Aynalı Çarşısı was published.

Theatre  
 Manik Atak : Bihter Dinçel – BKM – 2019
 Ex-Press : Mustafa Avkıran – Ankara State Theatre – 2009
 Tek Kişilik Şehir : Behiç Ak – Ankara State Theatre – 2008
 Kocasını Pişiren Kadın : Behiç Ak – Aysa Production Theatre – 2006
 Iron : Rona Munro – Ankara State Theatre – 2003
 Olağanüstü Bir Gece : Jerome Chodorov – Adana State Theatre – 2002
 Bağdat Hatun : Güngör Dilmen – Adana State Theatre – 2001
 The Taming of the Shrew : William Shakespeare – Adana State Theatre – 2000
 Pazartesi Perşembe : Musahipzade Celal – Adana State Theatre – 1999
 Frank V : Friedrich Dürrenmatt – Adana State Theatre – 1998
 Silvan'lı Kadınlar : İsmail Kaygusuz – Adana State Theatre – 1997
 Ayı ve Daha Birsürü : Anton Çehov – Adana State Theatre – 1997
 Üçkâğıtçı : Orhan Kemal – Adana State Theatre – 1997
 Midasın'ın Kulakları : Güngör Dilmen – Adana State Theatre – 1996
 Romeo and Juliet : William Shakespeare – Adana State Theatre – 1995
 Bozuk Düzen : Güner Sümer : Adana State Theatre – 1995
 Ağrı Dağı Efsanesi : Yaşar Kemal – Adana State Theatre – 1994
 Bir Şehnaz Oyun : Turgut Özakman – Ankara State Theatre – 1992
 Taziye : Murathan Mungan
 Binali ile Temir : Murathan Mungan
 Yaşasın Ölüm

Filmography 
 Annem Uyurken
 Unutma Beni
 Hisar Buselik
 Yeniden Başla
 Keşanlı Ali Destanı
 Annem Uyurken
 Kelebeğin Rüyası
 Ben Onu Çok Sevdim
 Düğün Dernek
 Analı Oğullu
 Anasının Oğlu
 Yağmur: Kıyamet Çiçeği
 Vicdan / 2013
 Hom Ofis / 2014
 8 Saniye / 2015
 Bana Masal Anlatma / 2015
 Çalsın Sazlar / 2015
 Düğün Dernek 2: Sünnet / 2015
 Tight Dress / 2016
 Ekşi Elmalar / 2016
 Cesur ve Güzel / 2016–17 (Mihriban Aydınbaş)
 Aile Arasında / 2017 (Mükerrem Kurt)
 Salur Kazan: Zoraki Kahraman / 2017
 Hayat Sırları / 2017 (Inci Kuzgun)
 Darısı Başımıza / 2018 (Zerrin)
 Hareket Sekiz / 2019 (Neriman)
 Baba Parası / 2020 (Yakut)
 Payitaht Abdülhamid (2019-2020) (Cemile Sultan)
 Şeref Bey / 2021 (Solmaz)
 Camdaki Kız / 2021– (Gülcihan Koroğlu)
 Sen Hiç Ateşböceği Gördün mü? / 2021 (Iclal)

Awards and nominations

References

External links 
 
 

1968 births
Turkish stage actresses
Ankara University alumni
Living people
Turkish television actresses
Turkish film actresses